Aissata Toure (born September 18, 1990) is a Guinean sprinter born in Conakry. She competed in the 100 metres competition at the 2012 Summer Olympics; she ran the preliminaries in 13.25 seconds, which did not qualify her for Round 1.

References

1990 births
Living people
Guinean female sprinters
Olympic athletes of Guinea
Athletes (track and field) at the 2012 Summer Olympics
People from Conakry
Olympic female sprinters